Fawzia Gilani-Williams is a British scholar of Islamic children's literature. She is also an author of children's literature as 'mirror books', an approach to writing and storytelling that reflects visibility for readers in story.  A significant number of her children's books are Islamic adaptations of Western tales, such as Cinderella, often featuring Muslim characters in caring interaction with each other and with Hebrew or Hindu characters.

Awards 
Her children's book Yaffa and Fatima: Shalom, Salaam, illustrated by Chiara Fedele, received a Sydney Taylor Silver Medalist Award in 2018 from the Association of Jewish Libraries.

Bibliography 
 Gilani-Williams, F., Bridget Hodder.(2022) The Button Box.
 Gilani-Williams, F.  (2020). Henna on my Hands. Bengaluru: Tulika Books.
Gilani-Williams, F.  (2019).  Adil Ali's Shoe. Speaking Tiger .
 Gilani-Williams, F. (2017). Yaffa and Fatima: shalom, salaam. Minneapolis: Kar-Ben Publishing. .
 Gilani-Williams, F. (2010). Nabeel's New Pants: an Eid tale. New York: Marshall Cavendish. 
Gilani-Williams, F. (2013). Snow White – An Islamic Tale. Leicester. England: Islamic Foundation.
Gilani, F. (2002). The Adventures of Musab. London: Ta-Ha Publishers.

Selected publications 

 Gilani-Williams, Fawzia. (2016). "The emergence of Western Islamic children’s literature". Mousaion, 34 (2), 113-126.
 Gilani-Williams, F. (2014). Islamic critical theory: A tool for emancipatory education. International Journal of Islamic Thought, 5, 16-27.

 Gilani, F. & Bigger, S. (2010) Muslim Pupils, Children's Fiction and Personal Understanding. Almas International Research Journal of Urdu, 12, 1-9. Print.

References 

Year of birth missing (living people)
Living people
British women children's writers
British Islamic studies scholars
British women writers
British writers of Indian descent